Events from the year 1864 in Mexico.

Incumbents
President: Benito Juárez

Governors
 Aguascalientes: 
 Campeche: Pablo García Montilla
 Chiapas: José Gabriel Esquinca/José Pantaleón Domínguez
 Chihuahua: 
 Coahuila: 
 Colima: Ramón R. De la Vega/Julio Garcia/José Maria Mendoza
 Durango:  
 Guanajuato: 
 Guerrero: 
 Jalisco: 
 State of Mexico:  
 Michoacán: 
 Nuevo León: Manuel Z. Gómez/Jerónimo Treviño
 Oaxaca: 
 Puebla: 
 Querétaro: Desiderio de Samaniego/Manuel Gutiérrez de Salceda y Gómez
 San Luis Potosí: 
 Sinaloa: 
 Sonora: 
 Tabasco: 
 Tamaulipas:	 
 Veracruz: 
 Yucatán: 
 Zacatecas:

Events
February 27 – Battle of San Juan Bautista
March 28,31 – Capture of Mazatlán
June 3 – 2nd Battle of Acapulco
October 3 – A destructive earthquake causes severe damage and 20 deaths southwest of Veracruz.
December 22 – Battle of San Pedro

Births
 January 20 — Carmen Romero Rubio, second wife of President Porfirio Díaz (d. 1944)

Deaths

References 

 
Years of the 19th century in Mexico